Serratia aquatilis  is a Gram-negative and rod-shaped bacteria from the genus of Serratia, which has been isolated from drinking-water systems.

References

Further reading

External links 
Type strain of Serratia aquatilis at BacDive -  the Bacterial Diversity Metadatabase

Bacteria described in 2016
Enterobacterales